Chyloderma is swelling of the scrotum resulting from chronic lymphatic obstruction. Obstruction may be caused by a nematode such as Wuchereria bancrofti. This condition is also known as lymphscrotum or elephantiasis scroti.

See also 

Filariasis
Lymphatic system

References 

Mammal male reproductive system